Scrum may refer to:

Sport 
 Scrum (rugby), a method of restarting play in rugby union and rugby league
 Scrum (rugby union), scrum in rugby union
 Scrum, an offensive melee formation in Japanese game Bo-taoshi

Media and popular culture 
 Media scrum, an impromptu press conference, often held immediately outside an event such as a legislative session or meeting
 "Scrum", a song on the album Diabolus in Musica by Slayer

Science and technology 
 Scrum (software development), a framework used for software development
 Scrum sprint

Other 
 Autozam Scrum, a microvan and pickup truck sold in Japan by Mazda

See also
 Scram (disambiguation)
 Line of scrimmage